This is a list of notable museums in India by state and union territory:

List

Andhra Pradesh

Arunachal Pradesh

Assam

Bihar

Chandigarh

Goa

Gujarat

Haryana

Himachal Pradesh

Jammu & Kashmir

Jharkhand

Karnataka

Kerala

Madhya Pradesh

Maharashtra

Manipur

Mizoram

Nagaland

Delhi

Odisha

Pondicherry/Puducherry

Punjab

Rajasthan

Sikkim

Tamil Nadu

Telangana

Tripura

Uttar Pradesh

West Bengal

See also
 List of archives in India
 List of museums
 International Museum Day
 Tourism in India
 Culture of India

By State 
 List of museums in Bihar
 List of museums in Karnataka
 List of museums in Kerala
 List of museums in Madhya Pradesh
 List of museums in Rajasthan
 List of museums in West Bengal

By subject 
List of aviation museums in India
List of transport museums in India
List of railway museums in India
List of music museums in India
List of science museums in India

Further reading

 Gupta, S. P., and Krishna Lal. 1974. Tourism, museums, and monuments in India. Delhi: Oriental Publishers.

References